The Holmes à Court Gallery is an art gallery located in the original Vasse Felix winery at Cowaramup (near Margaret River) in Western Australia. It is owned by Janet Holmes à Court.

Exhibits
The gallery displays works from the Holmes à Court Collection through a series of seasonal exhibitions. There is a sculpture garden extending into the grounds of the Vasse Felix winery, where sculptures by local artists are displayed in a garden setting. In 2013, the gallery installed The Art of Sound exhibition in collaboration with the National Film and Sound Archive of Australia.

History
The gallery was previously located in East Perth but relocated in October 2010 to the Vasse Felix site.

Holmes à Court Collection
The Holmes à Court family was interested in Australian art and commenced a collection in the early 1970s. The collection is now internationally renowned as it has over 4000 artworks, many of them being culturally significant works.

References

Art museums and galleries in Western Australia
Cowaramup, Western Australia